New Mexico State Road 17 (NM 17) is a  state highway in Rio Arriba County, New Mexico. Its southern end is at US 64-84 in Chama and its northern end is at Colorado State Highway 17 at the Colorado state line.

Route description 
The route begins at an intersection with US 64 and U.S. Route 84 in New Mexico south of Chama. The road then heads north into central Chama along Terrace Avenue. NM 17 then exits Chama and heads northeastward, passing through a wooded area in northern Rio Arriba County. The road then reaches the Colorado state line, where it becomes Colorado State Highway 17, heading north.

History
Before 1940 it was originally part of NM 2 then later U.S. Route 285 (US 285). It was renamed NM 19 in 1940 when US 285 was rerouted through Tres Piedras. Then in the 1950s it was renamed NM 17 to match Colorado State Highway 17 (SH 17).

Major intersections

See also

References

External links

017
Transportation in Rio Arriba County, New Mexico